A contact approach is an approach available to aircraft operating on an instrument flight rules (IFR) flight plan, where the pilot may deviate from the published instrument approach procedure (IAP) and proceed to the destination airport by visual reference to the surface. It is similar to a visual approach, except that the pilot is not required to have the destination airport nor the preceding aircraft in sight at all times during the approach, and the visibility requirements are less stringent.

Overview
Only pilots may initiate a request for this type of approach; regulations prohibit air traffic control (ATC) from asking pilots to perform them. A contact approach will only be issued if the aircraft is operating clear of clouds with at least 1 statute mile (1.6 km) of flight visibility, with a reasonable expectation of continuing to the destination airport under those conditions. Additionally, the reported ground visibility at the destination airport must be at least 1 statute mile (1.6 km).

In the execution of a contact approach, the pilot is responsible for obstruction clearance, but ATC will still provide separation from other IFR or special VFR traffic. If radar service is being received, it will automatically terminate when the pilot is instructed to change to the airport's advisory frequency. The pilot must advise ATC immediately if unable to continue the contact approach or if they encounter less than 1 statute mile (1.6 km) of flight visibility; new instructions will then be provided by ATC. Also, ATC may issue alternative instructions if, in their judgment, weather conditions may make completion of the approach impracticable. ATC will seldom clear pilots for a contact approach in complex, high-traffic airspace like that typically found around major commercial airports.

Purpose
The contact approach can be a time- and fuel-savings method of working the air traffic control system to a pilot's advantage. However, executing a contact approach in marginal visibility is similar to scud running–a dangerous practice–and can be frightening for inexperienced pilots; under such conditions, it should only be attempted by pilots who are intimately familiar with the destination airport, surrounding terrain, and prevailing weather, and whose experience suggests that the approach can be completed safely. Also, as a contact approach involves deviation from an IAP, standard missed approach procedures from the IAP do not apply, and the flight may be extensively rerouted by ATC if the contact approach is broken off; this may negate its potential advantages.

The Aeronautical Information Manual (AIM), published by the Federal Aviation Administration (FAA), emphasizes that the contact approach is meant only as a substitute for an IAP where one exists. A contact approach may not be used as an improvised IFR approach to an airport that lacks an IAP entirely, nor to approach one airport, break off the approach in visual conditions, and then fly to another airport.

See also
 Visual approach
 Instrument approach
 Night VFR (NVFR)
 Special visual flight rules (SVFR)
  (CVFR)

References

External links
 https://www.faa.gov/air_traffic/publications/atpubs/aim_html/

Air traffic control
Types of final approach (aviation)